Stan Van Sichem (born April 2, 1987) is a former professional Canadian football defensive lineman. He was drafted by the Montreal Alouettes in the fourth round of the 2009 CFL Draft. He played CIS football for the Regina Rams. On February 26, 2010 Stan was traded to the Winnipeg Blue Bombers in exchange for import defensive end Gavin Walls.

External links
Just Sports Stats
Montreal Alouettes bio

1987 births
Living people
Canadian football defensive linemen
Regina Rams players
Montreal Alouettes players
Sichem, Stan van